Mitchell Hahn (born 10 May 1981) is a former professional Australian rules footballer who played 181 games for the Western Bulldogs in the Australian Football League (AFL). He was the backline coach at the Brisbane Lions from October 2013 to 2016, and will be the NEAFL coach from 2017.

Originally from Brisbane in Queensland, he was chosen in the 1999 National AFL Draft at number 37, a trade the Bulldogs had received from Richmond in exchange for Leon Cameron.  As at the end of the 2005 season was part of the Bulldogs' leadership group.

The 2006 Record describes Hahn as being "immensely strong" with a "bullocking style of play". During a win against the Brisbane Lions at the Gabba in Round 18 2006, he hyperextended and severely injured his left knee upon landing after a running jump and laid on the ground clutching it. The game was held up as he was taken off on a stretcher. The injury forced him to miss the rest of the season and earlier parts of 2007. He was delisted by the Western Bulldogs on 10 November 2010, but was redrafted only through the Rookie Draft only weeks later. He has a son named Levi.

References

 AFL Record 2006 Season Preview, ed.  Michael Lovett, AFL Publishing.

External links

1981 births
Living people
Australian rules footballers from Queensland
Western Bulldogs players
Zillmere Eagles Australian Football Club players
Sportspeople from Brisbane